Misbehaving Ladies is a 1931 American Pre-Code comedy film directed by William Beaudine and starring Lila Lee, Ben Lyon and Louise Fazenda. It is also known as The Queen of Main Street.

Cast
 Lila Lee as Princess Ellen  
 Ben Lyon as Phil Hunter 
 Louise Fazenda as Aunt Kate Boyd  
 Lucien Littlefield as Uncle Joe Boyd 
 Julia Swayne Gordon as Princess Delatorre  
 Emily Fitzroy as Meta Oliver  
 Martha Mattox as Mrs. Twitchell 
 Virginia Grey as Hazel Boyd  
 Oscar Apfel as Mayor Twitchell

Preservation status
The film is preserved in the Library of Congress collection.

References

External links

1931 films
American comedy films
American black-and-white films
1931 comedy films
1930s English-language films
Films directed by William Beaudine
Warner Bros. films
1930s American films